Phragmipedium fischeri is a species of orchid endemic to Ecuador.

References

External links 

fischeri
Endemic orchids of Ecuador